Carmelo Ríos Figueroa (October 11, 1959 – October 21, 2022) was a Puerto Rican long-distance runner, who competed for his native country in the men's 3000 m steeplechase at the 1984 Summer Olympics. He set his personal best (8:28.89) in that event on June 17, 1983 in Indianapolis, Indiana.

Background
Ríos was the silver medalist at the 1983 Pan American Games and competed at the 1983 World Championships in Athletics later that year, where he was knocked out in the heats stage. In his only Olympic appearance in 1984, he finished twelfth in his semi-final in the men's steeplechase. He took the bronze medal at the 1985 CAC Championships.

Ríos attended California Polytechnic State University, San Luis Obispo, where he still holds the school record in the Steeplechase set at the USA Outdoor Track and Field Championships in Indianapolis, Indiana at 8:28.89 from 1983.  Prior to Cal Poly, he competed for Long Beach City College, winning the state community college championship back to back in 1979 and 80.  He was also the Southern California champion at 10,000 meters and the third individual at the State Cross Country championships.  In 2013, he was honored in the Long Beach City College "Hall of Champions."

Death
Ríos died on October 21, 2022, at the age of 63.

Achievements

Notes

References

External links
 
 sports-reference

1959 births
2022 deaths
Place of birth missing
Puerto Rican male steeplechase runners
Puerto Rican male long-distance runners
Pan American Games silver medalists for Puerto Rico
Pan American Games medalists in athletics (track and field)
Olympic track and field athletes of Puerto Rico
Athletes (track and field) at the 1983 Pan American Games
Athletes (track and field) at the 1984 Summer Olympics
California Polytechnic State University alumni
Medalists at the 1983 Pan American Games